Robustum nodum is the one species of a problematic genus of Ordovician hemithecellid mollusc proposed by Stinchcomb and Darrough in 1995.
Its similarities to Matthevia were outlined by Vendrasco & Runnegar.

References

Ordovician molluscs
Chitons
Fossil taxa described in 1995
Fossils of the United States